The Old Settler's Pavilion near Pekin, North Dakota, in Stump Lake Park upon Stump Lake, was built in 1920.  It has also been known as Stump Lake Park Pavilion.

It was listed on the National Register of Historic Places in 2010.

The historic Stump Lake pavilion, then 90 years old, was in danger of flooding in 2009 due to rising level of Stump Lake, and a proposed action to build a wall to protect it was under discussion.

References

Park buildings and structures on the National Register of Historic Places in North Dakota
Buildings and structures completed in 1920
National Register of Historic Places in Grand Forks County, North Dakota
Pavilions in the United States
1920 establishments in North Dakota